This is a list of electoral results for the electoral district of Waranga in Victorian state elections.

Members for Waranga

Election results

Elections in the 1940s

Elections in the 1930s

 Coyle was elected as a UAP member for Waranga in the 1932 election, but joined the Country party in 1933.

Elections in the 1920s

 Preferences were not distributed.

Elections in the 1910s

References

Victoria (Australia) state electoral results by district